In the Eastern Orthodox Church, in Eastern and Latin Catholic churches, and in the teaching of the Church Fathers which undergirds the theology of those communions, economy or oeconomy (oikonomia) has several meanings. The basic meaning of the word is "handling" or "disposition" or "management"  of a thing, or more literally "housekeeping", usually assuming or implying good or prudent handling (as opposed to poor handling) of the matter at hand. In short, economia is a discretionary deviation from the letter of the law in order to adhere to the spirit of the law and charity. This is in contrast to  legalism, or akribia, which is strict adherence to the letter of the law of the church.

Eastern Orthodoxy

Divine economy
The divine economy, in Eastern Orthodoxy, not only refers to God's actions to bring about the world's salvation and redemption, but to all of God's dealings with, and interactions with, the world, including the Creation.

According to Lossky, theology (literally, "words about God" or "teaching about God") was concerned with all that pertains to God alone, in himself, i.e. the teaching on the Trinity, the divine attributes, and so on; but it was not concerned with anything pertaining to the creation or the redemption. Lossky writes: "The distinction between  [economy] and  [theology] [...] remains common to most of the Greek Fathers and to all of the Byzantine tradition.  [...] means, in the fourth century, everything which can be said of God considered in Himself, outside of His creative and redemptive economy. To reach this 'theology' properly so-called, one therefore must go beyond [...] God as Creator of the universe, in order to be able to extricate the notion of the Trinity from the cosmological implications proper to the 'economy.' "

Ecclesiastical economy
The Ecumenical Patriarchate considers that through "extreme oikonomia [economy]", those who are baptized in the Oriental Orthodox, Roman Catholic, Lutheran, Old Catholic, Moravian, Anglican, Methodist, Reformed, Presbyterian, Church of the Brethren, Assemblies of God, or Baptist traditions can be received into the Eastern Orthodox Church through the sacrament of Chrismation and not through re-baptism.

Canon law 
In the canon law of the Eastern Orthodox Church, the notions of akriveia and economia (economy) also exist. Akriveia, which is harshness, "is the strict application (sometimes even extension) of the penance given to an unrepentant and habitual offender." Economia, which is sweetness, "is a judicious relaxation of the penance when the sinner shows remorse and repentance."

Catholicism 
According to the Catechism of the Catholic Church:

See also
 The Economy of God
 Economy of Salvation
 Dispensation (Catholic Church)

References

Christian ethics
Eastern Orthodox theology
Catholic theology and doctrine
Canon law of the Eastern Orthodox Church